Dillon Price, better known by his gamertag Attach, is a professional Call of Duty player who currently plays for the Minnesota RØKKR. His most notable roles before being on FaZe include playing for Rise Nation and Denial eSports. He won the Call of Duty Championship 2015 with Denial. He also runs an active YouTube channel.

Career
Attach started gaming when he was a young kid. Attach first heard about competitive Call of Duty from a friend that was on his travel baseball team and was playing GameBattles at the time. Attach's first tournament was at MLG Anaheim 2013 where he placed 29th. Then after that, he placed 17th at UMG Dallas with Termination.

Once Call of Duty: Ghosts came around, Attach joined Team eLevate. They took 8th place at UMG Philadelphia. Then at MLG X Games Invitational, he took home 5th place with Curse Orange. Then he joined Rise Nation where he would take 13th/16th at UMG Dallas. In November 2014 Attach joined Denial.

Attach began the Advanced Warfare season playing under Denial after replacing StuDyy. Alongside ZooMaa, Saints, and Replays, he acquired a 5-6th placing at the first event, MLG Columbus 2014. The roster saw more success at UMG Orlando with a 3rd-place finish. In March, Denial won the 2015 Call of Duty Championships.

In June Attach and Clayster left Denial and soon joined FaZe Clan.

Attach is the youngest player to ever win the Call of Duty World Championship at the age of 18 years 84 days.

He joined the New York Subliners in September 2019.

In July 2020 while playing for the New York Subliners, Attach won the New York Subliners Home Series.

Attach joined the Minnesota ROKKR in September 2020. On August 1st, 2021 at the Call Of Duty league Major 5 in Arlington, Texas, Attach and the rest of the Minnesota ROKKR team made Call Of Duty history after being down 0-4 to Toronto Ultra and completing a reverse sweep to win 5-4 in a best of 9 in the grand finals.

Tournament results

Denial eSports

 5-6th — MLG Columbus Open 2014
 3rd — UMG Orlando 2015
 2nd — MLG Pro League Season 1 Playoffs
 2nd — Call of Duty Championship 2015: NA Regional Finals
 1st — Call of Duty Championship 2015
 2nd — EWSC Zénith 2015
 5-8th — Gfinity Spring Masters 1
 5-6th — X Games Austin 2015

FaZe Clan
 1st — UMG Dallas 2015
 1st — Gfinity Summer Championship
 7-8th — UMG Washington D.C. 2015
 1st — MLG Pro League Season 3 Playoffs
 5-6th — MLG World Finals 2015
 5-8th — Totino's Invitational 2015
 5-8th — UMG South Carolina 2016
 1st — CWL Global Pro League Season 1 Playoffs
 5-6th — MLG Anaheim 2018
 5-6th — CWL Global Pro League Season 2 Playoffs
 3rd — Call of Duty Championship 2018

New York Subliners
 1st — New York Home Series Event

Minnesota ROKKR
 9-10th  — CDL Stage 1 Major 2021
 4th     — CDL Stage 2 Major 2021
 9-10th  — CDL Stage 3 Major 2021
 5-6th   — CDL Stage 4 Major Arlington 2021
 1st     — CDL Stage 5 Major Arlington 2021
4th      — CDL Champs Los Angeles 2021
 7-8th   — CDL Stage 1 OpTic Texas Major 2022
 9-12th  — CDL Stage 2 Minnesota ROKKR Major 2022
 7-8th   — CDL Stage 3 Toronto Ultra Major 2022
 9-12th  - CDL Stage 4 New York Subliners Major 2022

References

External links
 

Call of Duty players
Living people
American esports players
Team Curse players
FaZe Clan players
Denial Esports players
Twitch (service) streamers
Year of birth missing (living people)